This page provides the summaries of the matches of the qualifying rounds for the Football at the 1984 Summer Olympics to be held in Los Angeles. In the end three countries qualified.

Preliminary round

|}

First round

|}

Algeria on away goals rule

Second round

|}

Ethiopia on away goals rule

Third round

|}

Cameroon, Egypt and Morocco qualified.

External links 
Games of the XXIII. Olympiad - African Football Qualifying Tournament (Los Angeles, USA, 1984) - Rec.Sport.Soccer Statistics Foundation

Football qualification for the 1984 Summer Olympics
Football at the Summer Olympics – Men's African Qualifiers